is a Japanese professional kickboxer, currently competing in the bantamweight divisions of K-1 and Krush. 

A professional competitor since 2019, Ikeda is the current Krush Bantamweight champion. As of April 2022, Combat Press ranks him as the eight best strawweight kickboxer in the world.

Kickboxing career

Early career
Ikeda made his professional debut against Kosuke at K-1 KRUSH FIGHT 106 on October 13, 2019. He won the fight by a first-round knockout. Ikeda faced Yuki Toyoda at K-1 World GP 2019 Japan: ～Women's Flyweight Championship Tournament～ on December 28, 2019, in his second professional bout. He won the fight by unanimous decision, with scores of 29–28, 29–28 and 30–28.

Ikeda was booked to face the 1-2 Mao Hashimoto at Krush 115 on July 21, 2020. He lost the fight by unanimous decision, with scores of 30–28, 30–28 and 29–28. After suffering the first loss of his professional career, Ikeda was scheduled to participate in the 2020 Krush bantamweight tournament. Ikeda faced Begin Yoshioka in the tournament quarterfinals, held at Krush 118 on October 17, 2020. He lost the fight by split decision.

Ikeda was booked to face Yuya Uzawa at Krush 120 on December 19, 2020. He won the fight by unanimous decision, with scores of 30–27, 30–27 and 30–28, successfully snapping his two-fight losing skid. Ikeda next faced Eiki Kurata at K-1: K'Festa 4 Day 1 on March 21, 2021. Kurata missed weight by 500 g at the official weigh-ins. He won the fight by a second-round knockout.

This two fight streak earned Ikeda a place in the  2021 K-1 Japan Bantamweight Tournament, which took place on May 29, 2021. He faced the eventual tournament winner Toma Kuroda in the quarterfinal bout, which he lost by a second round knockout. Ikeda was first knocked down with a counter left-straight at the end of the opening round, before suffering a flying knee knockdout 50 seconds into the next round.

Ikeda faced Daiki Mine at Krush 128 on August 21, 2021. He rebounded from his third professional loss with a unanimous decision win against Mine, with scores of 30–27, 30–26 and 30–26. He scored the sole knockdown of the fight in the first round, as he dropped Mine with a right straight. Ikeda next faced Kazuki Fujita at Krush 131 on November 20, 2021. He won the fight by a third-round technical knockout, stopping Fujita with right straights.

Krush bantamweight champion
His two-fight winning streak earned Ikeda the opportunity to challenge the reigning Krush Bantamweight champion Kazuki Miburo on March 26, 2022, in the main event of Krush 135. He won the fight by majority decision, with two judges awarding him a 30–29 scorecards, while the third judge scored the bout as an even 30–30 draw.

Ikeda made his first Krush title defense against the 2020 K-1 Koshien super bantamweight tournament winner Aoi Noda. The bout was scheduled as the main event of Krush 139, which took place on July 30, 2022. Ikeda retained the title by a first-round knockout. He knocked Noda down with a spinning backfist early in the second round and stopped him with a right straight soon after.

On October 14, it was announced that Ikeda would particulate in the 2022 K-1 Bantamweight World Grand Prix, which was scheduled to take place at K-1 World GP 2022 in Osaka on December 3, 2022. Ikeda faced the FCKBMT -57kg champion Ambi Nsue Avomo in the quarterfinals of the one-day tournament. He stopped Avomo with a liver kick in the second round, after knocking him down with a right straight in the first round, and faced the multiple-time muay thai champion Issei Ishii in the semifinals. He lost the fight by unanimous decision, with scores of 30–29, 30–29 and 30–28.

Ikeda made his second Krush Bantamweight title defense against Kiri Matsutani at Krush 146 on February 25, 2023. He won the fight by a second-round knockout.

Championships and accomplishments
Amateur
K-1
2019 K-1 College Tournament Winner (-55 kg)
World Muay Thai Council
2018 WMC Japan Amateur -54kg Champion
Professional
Krush
2022 Krush Bantamweight Championship
Two successful title defenses

Kickboxing record

|- style="background:#cfc" 
| 2023-02-25 || Win ||align=left| Kiri Matsutani || Krush 146 || Tokyo, Japan || KO (Left hook) || 2 ||1:08
|-
! style=background:white colspan=9 |

|-  style="background:#fbb"
| 2022-12-03|| Loss ||align=left| Issei Ishii ||  K-1 World GP 2022 in Osaka Bantamweight World Grand Prix, Semi Final || Osaka, Japan || Decision (Unanimous) || 3 || 3:00

|-  style="background:#cfc"
| 2022-12-03|| Win ||align=left| Ambi Nsue Avomo ||  K-1 World GP 2022 in Osaka Bantamweight World Grand Prix, Quarter Final || Osaka, Japan || KO (Liver kick)|| 2 ||1:15

|- style="background:#cfc" 
| 2022-07-30 || Win||align=left| Aoi Noda || Krush 139 || Tokyo, Japan || KO (Right cross)||2  ||0:57
|-
! style=background:white colspan=9 |

|- style="background:#cfc" 
| 2022-03-26 || Win ||align=left| Kazuki Miburo || Krush 135 || Tokyo, Japan || Decision (Majority) || 3 ||3:00
|-
! style=background:white colspan=9 |
|-
|- style="background:#cfc" 
| 2021-11-20 || Win ||align=left| Kazuki Fujita || Krush 131 || Tokyo, Japan || TKO (Right straights) || 3 || 2:17
|-
|- style="background:#cfc" 
| 2021-08-21 || Win ||align=left| Daiki Mine || Krush 128 || Tokyo, Japan || Decision (Unanimous) || 3 || 3:00
|-
|- style="background:#fbb" 
| 2021-05-29 || Loss ||align=left| Toma Kuroda || K-1 World GP 2021: Japan Bantamweight Tournament, Quarter Final || Tokyo, Japan || KO (Flying knee) || 2 || 2:10
|-
|- style="background:#cfc" 
| 2021-03-21 || Win ||align=left| Eiki Kurata || K'Festa 4 Day 1 || Tokyo, Japan || KO (Right straight) || 2 || 1:55
|-
|- style="background:#cfc" 
| 2020-12-19|| Win ||align=left| Yuya Uzawa || Krush 120 || Tokyo, Japan || Decision (Unanimous) || 3 || 3:00
|-
|- style="background:#fbb" 
| 2020-10-17 || Loss ||align=left| Begin Yoshioka || Krush 118 || Tokyo, Japan || Decision (Split) || 3 || 3:00
|-
|- style="background:#fbb" 
| 2020-07-21 || Loss ||align=left| Mao Hashimoto || Krush 115 || Tokyo, Japan || Decision (Unanimous) || 3 || 3:00
|-
|- style="background:#cfc" 
| 2019-12-28 || Win ||align=left| Yuki Toyoda || K-1 World GP 2019 Japan: ～Women's Flyweight Championship Tournament～ || Nagoya, Japan || Decision (Unanimous) || 3 || 3:00
|-
|- style="background:#cfc" 
| 2019-10-13 || Win ||align=left| Kosuke || K-1 KRUSH FIGHT 106 || Tokyo, Japan || KO (Left straight) || 1 || 1:18
|-
| colspan=9 | Legend:    

|-  style="background:#CCFFCC;"
| 2019-08-04|| Win ||align=left| Daito Arima || K-1 2019 College Tournament, Finals || Tokyo, Japan || Decision (Unanimous)|| 1 || 3:00
|-
! style=background:white colspan=9 |
|-
|-  style="background:#CCFFCC;"
| 2019-08-04|| Win ||align=left| Gentaro Iwamoto || K-1 2019 College Tournament, Semifinals || Tokyo, Japan ||TKO (Right cross)|| 1 ||1:10 
|-
|-  style="background:#CCFFCC;"
| 2019-08-04|| Win ||align=left| Masaru Ito || K-1 2019 College Tournament, Quarterfinals || Tokyo, Japan || Decision (Split)|| 1 || 2:00
|-  style="text-align:center; background:#cfc;"
| 2018-12-16|| Win || align=left| Rinta Gyoda || WMC Japan Amateur 4|| Yokohama, Japan || KO || ||
|-
! style=background:white colspan=9 |
|-  style="text-align:center; background:#cfc;"
| 2018-12-02|| Win || align=left| Raito Tamagawa || 7th K-1 Amateur All Japan, One match|| Tokyo, Japan || Decision (Split) || 1 ||3:00
|-  style="text-align:center; background:#cfc;"
| 2018-10-14|| Win || align=left| Koya Kinoshita || WMC Japan Amateur 3, Final|| Tokyo, Japan || Decision  || 2 ||2:00
|-  style="text-align:center; background:#cfc;"
| 2018-10-14|| Win || align=left| Yudai Takahashi || WMC Japan Amateur 3, Semi Final|| Tokyo, Japan || Decision  || 2 ||2:00
|-  style="text-align:center; background:#cfc;"
| 2018-07-01|| Win || align=left| Yuhei Uematsu || WMC Japan Amateur 2|| Yokohama, Japan || Decision  || 2 ||2:00
|-
| colspan=9 | Legend:

See also
 List of male kickboxers
 List of Krush champions

References

Living people
1997 births
Japanese male kickboxers
People from Takasaki, Gunma
Sportspeople from Gunma Prefecture